The men's track time trial was a track cycling event held as part of the Cycling at the 1964 Summer Olympics programme. It was held on 16 October 1964 at the Hachioji Velodrome. Twenty-seven cyclists from 27 nations competed, with each nation limited to one competitor. The event was won by Patrick Sercu of Belgium, the nation's first victory in the men's track time trial and first medal in the event since 1948. Giovanni Pettenella's silver medal put Italy on the podium for the event for the fourth consecutive Games, while Pierre Trentin's bronze was the first medal for France in the event since 1948.

Background

This was the ninth appearance of the event, which had previously been held in 1896 and every Games since 1928. It would be held every Games until being dropped from the programme after 2004. The only returning cyclist from the 1960 Games was fourth-place finisher Piet van der Touw of the Netherlands. Patrick Sercu was the 1963 sprint world champion.

Cambodia, the Republic of China, Malaysia, and Thailand each made their debut in the men's track time trial. France and Great Britain each made their ninth appearance, having competed at every appearance of the event.

Competition format

The event was a time trial on the track, with each cyclist competing separately to attempt to achieve the fastest time. Each cyclist raced one kilometre from a standing start.

Records

The following were the world and Olympic records prior to the competition.

No new world or Olympic records were set during the competition.

Schedule

All times are Japan Standard Time (UTC+9)

Results

Sources

References

Cycling at the Summer Olympics – Men's track time trial
Track cycling at the 1964 Summer Olympics